Hannover-Land I is an electoral constituency (German: Wahlkreis) represented in the Bundestag. It elects one member via first-past-the-post voting. Under the current constituency numbering system, it is designated as constituency 43. It is located in central Lower Saxony, comprising the northern part of the Hanover Region.

Hannover-Land I was created for the 1980 federal election. Since 2021, it has been represented by Rebecca Schamber of the Social Democratic Party (SPD).

Geography
Hannover-Land I is located in central Lower Saxony. As of the 2021 federal election, it comprises the northern part of the Hanover Region, specifically the municipalities of Burgdorf, Burgwedel, Garbsen, Isernhagen, Langenhagen, Neustadt am Rübenberge, Wedemark, and Wunstorf.

History
Hannover-Land I was created in 1980 and contained parts of the abolished constituencies of Hannover III, Schaumburg, Celle, and Gifhorn. From the 1980 through 1998 elections, it was number 38. In the 2002 and 2005 elections, it was number 43. In the 2009 election, it was number 44. Since the 2013 election, it has been number 43.

Originally, the constituency comprised the municipalities of Burgdorf, Burgwedel, Garbsen, Isernhagen, Langenhagen, Neustadt am Rübenberge, Wedemark, Lehrte, and Uetze from the now-abolished Landkreis Hannover district. In the 2002 election, it lost the municipalities of Lehrte and Uetze while gaining Wunstorf.

Members
The constituency was first held by future Chancellor of Germany Gerhard Schröder, a member of the Social Democratic Party (SPD), who served from 1980 to 1983. Dietmar Kansy of the Christian Democratic Union (CDU) was elected in 1983 and served until 1998. SPD candidate Monika Ganseforth won in 1998 and served a single term, before being succeeded by party fellow Caren Marks in 2002. In 2013, Hendrik Hoppenstedt of the CDU was elected representative. Rebecca Schamber regained the constituency for the SPD in 2021.

Election results

2021 election

2017 election

2013 election

2009 election

References

Federal electoral districts in Lower Saxony
Hanover
1980 establishments in West Germany
Constituencies established in 1980